Alexander Glazunov composed his Piano Concerto No. 1 in F minor, Opus, 92, in 1911, during his tenure as director of the St. Petersburg Conservatory. The concerto is dedicated to Leopold Godowsky, whom Glazunov had heard on tour in St. Petersburg in 1905.

Form
The concerto is written in two movements, the second being a theme and variations forming an amalgam of slow movement, scherzando elements and finale (coda).

Notes

Bibliography
Pott, Francis, Notes for Hyperion CDA66877: Glazunov: Piano Concertos; Goedicke: Concertstück; Stephen Coombs, piano; BBC Scottish Symphony Orchestra conducted by Martyn Brabbins.

External links

Glazunov
Piano concerto 1
1911 compositions
Compositions in F minor